History of the Old Kent Road is a mural by the Polish artist Adam Kossowski. It is on the exterior of the former North Peckham Civic Centre in London.

External links
 
 Article by Lynn Pearson containing information on the Old Kent Road Mural
 The History of the Old Kent Road photoset on Flickr
 The Twentieth Century Society has launched a campaign to protect murals such as this.
"The Civic Centre Which Told and Played Its Part in Local History"  by Gavriel Hollander, Southwark News, 27 May 2008
"History of the Old Kent Road | Details of a Stunning Tiled Mural," Look Up London, 19 January 2021

Murals in London
Peckham
Grade II listed buildings in the London Borough of Southwark